Patrick Henry (31 March 1953 – 3 December 2017) was a French criminal and cause célèbre and the subject of public and judicial controversy. He was convicted of the kidnapping and murder of the eight-year-old Philippe Bertrand in January 1976.

Trial and sentencing 
Henry's trial began on 18 January 1977, and he was defended by Robert Bocquillon and Robert Badinter. A contentious issue in the trial was the validity of capital punishment in France; Badinter, a fervent supporter of its abolition, ultimately convinced the jury not to execute his client. The case is said to have had an influence in leading to the abolition of the death penalty in France in 1981. Henry was instead sentenced to life imprisonment and was paroled in 2001; however, he returned to prison two years later after being caught trying to smuggle drugs into France. He was subsequently denied parole multiple times before finally succeeding and being released from prison on medical grounds in September 2017.

Death 
Henry died of lung cancer in Lille, aged 64, on 3 December 2017, barely three months after his release from prison.

References 

1953 births
2017 deaths
Deaths from lung cancer in France
French drug traffickers
French cannabis traffickers
French murderers of children
People from Troyes

20th-century French criminals